Campustown is an area within the 1st and 2nd City Council Districts in Champaign, Illinois.  Centered on Green Street, the district contains about eight city blocks occupied by various small businesses, restaurants, bars, and apartment buildings which mostly house university students. Campustown is located along the west side of the University of Illinois Urbana–Champaign campus.

Notable landmarks include the Alma Mater, The Tower at Third, the 309 Green high-rise, Legend's Bar & Grill, Red Lion, and Murphy's Pub.

Master streetscape plan
In 1995, then University of Illinois at Urbana–Champaign (UIUC) Provost Michael Aiken constructed a planning committee, referred to as the Campustown 2000 Task Force, in an effort to revitalize the deteriorating infrastructure in the campustown district. As the committee's chairperson, Aiken hoped to transform the district into a safer, more inviting area for university students and visitors. The committee was composed of representatives from the cities of Champaign, its twin city Urbana, the Champaign County Chamber of Commerce, the C-U Economic Partnership, land and business owners within campustown, and UIUC.

Since the creation of the district, campustown's main thoroughfare, East Green Street, carried four lanes of vehicular traffic, despite serving a mostly pedestrian-based commercial district for the university. Campustown's deteriorating infrastructure was highlighted when a student was killed by vehicular traffic and during the 2002 NFL season when the Chicago Bears played their home games at Memorial Stadium during the renovation of Soldier Field.

The Campustown 2000 Task Force was instrumental in moving the development of Green Street and the rest of Campustown. This group initiated two efforts, the Campus Area Transformation Study (CATS) and the Campustown Action Plan, that outlined important changes that needed to be made in order to create a safer and more welcoming environment for students and others visiting the location. Coupled with the Campustown Existing Conditions Report, created by the City of Champaign Planning Department between 1996 and 1998, the Champaign City Council was able to approve plans for a seven million dollar project, which was completed in 2003. Green Street was reconstructed from Wright to Fourth Streets and various safety features were added such as new street-lights, railings, large planters, and proper signage. To facilitate the construction of a new Champaign-Urbana Mass Transit District bus stop, Wright Street was converted to a pedestrian mall allowing bus access only between Chalmers and John Streets. Since the creation of the Transit Plaza, it has become the largest bus stop in the Champaign–Urbana metropolitan area.

The resulting streetscape of Campustown has been very well-received, and is so far considered a resounding success. It achieved a number of the goals set forth in the Campustown Action Plan, most notable Goal II, "Develop an Overall Look for the Campustown Area," and Goal III, "Maintain and Improve Campustown Infrastructure." In order to build on the successes of the Campustown Action Plan, and also further its goals, the City of Champaign developed the University District Streetscape Master Plan in Fall of 2003. This plan not only focuses on the Green Street area, but highlights changes to be made throughout the entire University District. The planned improvements differ by each street, and are broken down into three categories: the Commercial Area, the Transition Area, and the Neighborhood Area. The full plan discusses proposed changes to the infrastructure of each area type, and goes over estimated costs as well as projects that should be prioritized over others

Urban core development
Over the past 10 years, since the completion of the Campustown 2000 project, the Campustown skyline and streetscape has drastically transformed. While the Tower at Third high-rise, which stands , was completed in 1972, another high-rise had not been built in Campustown until after the completion of Campustown 2000. In 2008, two high-rise residential towers opened for residents, 309 Green and Burnham 310. The 2008 Economic Recession nixed plans for another high-rise at 311 Green, which would have been a "sister building" to 309 Green, though the same developers have submitted plans for an 8-story apartment building at Fourth and Green.

Since the start of 2013, construction projects have restarted in campustown. Bankier Apartments has contracted Broeren-Russo Company of Champaign to build their 14-story residential high-rise at 519 East Green. The tower was completed just before the summer of 2014. Under construction are the 22-story 308-312 East Green Street and US$20 million 526 East Green Street mixed residential and commercial buildings.

Tallest buildings
Below is a listing of the tallest buildings in Champaign's Campustown district, by height.

Gallery

References

External links
 Official Campustown website
 Official Campustown Twitter
 BuildingGreenStreet.com

Academic enclaves
Buildings and structures in Champaign, Illinois
Student quarters
University of Illinois Urbana-Champaign